Rinaldo Castellenghi (born 17 May 1906 in Milan, date of death unknown) is an Italian boxer who competed in the 1924 Summer Olympics. In 1924 he finished fourth in the flyweight class. He lost in the semi-finals to the upcoming gold medalist Fidel LaBarba and was not able to compete in the bronze medal bout with Raymond Fee.

References

External links
profile

1906 births
Year of death missing
Boxers from Milan
Flyweight boxers
Olympic boxers of Italy
Boxers at the 1924 Summer Olympics
Italian male boxers